Jenkinsville may refer to:

Jenkinsville, Indiana
Jenkinsville, South Carolina
Jenkinsville, Wisconsin